James Oliver Ellison (January 11, 1929 – November 22, 2014) was a United States district judge of the United States District Court for the Northern District of Oklahoma.

Education and career

Ellison was born on January 11, 1929, in St. Louis, Missouri, In 1946, he graduated from the Oklahoma Military Academy (located on what is now the campus of Rogers State University in Claremore, Oklahoma).

Ellison received a Bachelor of Arts degree from the University of Oklahoma in 1951 and concurrently received a Bachelor of Laws from the University of Oklahoma College of Law in 1951. He served in the United States Army from 1951 to 1953, achieving the rank of captain. He was in private practice in Red Fork, Oklahoma from 1953 to 1955, and in Tulsa, Oklahoma from 1955 to 1979.

Federal judicial service

On September 28, 1979, Ellison was nominated by President Jimmy Carter to a seat on the United States District Court for the Northern District of Oklahoma vacated by Judge Allen E. Barrow. Ellison was confirmed by the United States Senate on October 31, 1979, and received his commission on November 2, 1979. 

Ellison served as Chief Judge from 1992 to 1994, assuming senior status on November 7, 1994. He died in Tulsa on November 22, 2014, aged 85.

References

Sources
 

1929 births
2014 deaths
Lawyers from St. Louis
Lawyers from Tulsa, Oklahoma
University of Oklahoma alumni
University of Oklahoma College of Law alumni
Judges of the United States District Court for the Northern District of Oklahoma
United States district court judges appointed by Jimmy Carter
20th-century American judges
United States Army officers